Thomas Jorge Garcia Seyfried (born 25 October 1994), known as just Thomas Garcia, is a French professional footballer who plays as a right-back.

Career
A youth product of FC Bagnols Pont since the age of 9, Garcia signed a professional contract with Paris FC on 23 July 2019 after a successful debut season with Portuguese club Pedras Rubras. He made his professional debut in a 3–0 Ligue 2 loss to FC Lorient on 29 July 2019.

References

External links
 
 
 

1994 births
Living people
People from Bagnols-sur-Cèze
French footballers
French people of Spanish descent
Association football fullbacks
Paris FC players
Ligue 2 players
Campeonato de Portugal (league) players
French expatriate footballers
French expatriate sportspeople in Portugal
Sportspeople from Gard
Footballers from Occitania (administrative region)